Henry Addington, a member of the Tories, was appointed by King George III to lead the government of the United Kingdom of Great Britain and Ireland from 1801 to 1804 and served as an interlude between Pitt. Ministries. Addington's ministry is most notable for negotiating the Treaty of Amiens, which marked a brief cessation of the Napoleonic Wars.

Cabinet

:

Changes
May 1801Lord Lewisham (from July Earl of Dartmouth) enters the Cabinet as President of the Board of Control.
July 1801The Duke of Portland succeeds Lord Chatham as Lord President (Chatham remains Master of the Ordnance). Lord Pelham of Stanmer succeeds Portland as Home Secretary.
July 1802Lord Castlereagh succeeds Dartmouth at the Board of Control.
August 1803Charles Philip Yorke succeeds Pelham as Home Secretary.

Notes

References

 
 

British ministries
1801 establishments in the United Kingdom
1804 disestablishments in the United Kingdom
1800s in the United Kingdom
Ministries of George III of the United Kingdom
Cabinets established in 1801
Cabinets disestablished in 1804